The 1946 Arizona State Sun Devils football team was an American football team that represented Arizona State College (later renamed Arizona State University) in the Border Conference during the 1946 college football season. In their first and only season under head coach Steve Coutchie, the Sun Devils compiled a 2–7–2 record (1–4–1 against Border opponents) and were outscored by their opponents by a combined total of 313 to 93.

Schedule

References

Arizona State
Arizona State Sun Devils football seasons
Arizona State Sun Devils football